Venture Smith (Birth name: Broteer Furro) (c. 1729 – 1805) was an African-American farmer and craftsman. Smith was kidnapped when he was six and a half years old in West Africa and was taken to Anomabo on the Gold Coast (modern-day Ghana) to be sold into slavery. As an adult, he purchased his freedom and that of his family. He documented his life in A Narrative of the Life and Adventures of Venture, a Native of Africa: But Resident above Sixty Years in the United States of America, Related by Himself. This autobiography is one of the earliest known examples of an autobiographical narrative in an entirely African American literary vericas, only about a dozen left behind first-hand accounts of their experiences.

Smith was renamed "Venture" by Robinson Mumford, who was his first white enslaver. Mumford decided to call him "Venture" because he considered purchasing him to be a business venture. Mumford bought Venture with four gallons of rum and a piece of calico. After regaining his freedom, Smith adopted his last name from Oliver Smith (the last person to enslave him). In his narrative, Smith describes his people in his native country as having been generally of great bodily stature, stout and tall. This is confirmed by the archaeological project in 2007 and the runaway ad from 1754.

Venture Smith died in 1805. He is buried at the First Church of Christ cemetery in East Haddam, Connecticut, now a site on the Connecticut Freedom Trail.

Smith's autobiographical narrative

Early life
Broteer (Venture Smith) was born in a place he recalls as Dukandarra in "Guinea"—a term that at the time referred to much of West Africa.  Dukandarra, argues Chandler B. Saint, a historian with the Documenting Venture Smith Project, was probably in the Savannah region.

His father was Saungm Furro, the prince of Dukandarra. His mother was the first of his three wives and Broteer was the first of her three children. She left Saungm Furro's village after he married another wife without her permission, although polygamy was not uncommon in that country, especially among the rich, as every man was allowed to keep as many wives as he could maintain. She took her three children with her. Traveling 140 miles over four days the group relied on foraging for food. The young Broteer was left in the care of a wealthy farmer while his mother her home country. While at this farm, Broteer was tasked with caring for the owner's flock of 40 sheep. He remained on the farm for about a year before his father sent an emissary to retrieve him.

Six weeks after he returned to his father's village, Broteer learned that the country of the farmer he had just left had been invaded by a large, foreign army. The nation had not prepared for war in a long time; hence, the villagers had to evacuate. Saungm Furro agreed to give aid in the form of providing a safe haven. Shortly after the refugees arrived, an enemy messenger arrived and demanded the payment "of a large sum of money, 300 fat cattle, and a great number of goats, sheep, asses, etc..." The threat of invasion and war was enough for Saugm Furro to agree to the terms.

Despite paying the enemy what they had asked for, Saungm Furro's village was attacked by a force of 6,000 men. Broteer, his family, and the entire village fled. On the way, Saungm Furro discovered a scouting party of the enemy and he discharged arrows at them. They were all soon captured. Saungm Furro was interrogated because the invaders knew that he had money. He was tortured to death for refusing to reveal the location of his money.  This event stuck with Broteer for the rest of his life, "the shocking scene is to this day fresh in my mind, and I have often been overcome while thinking on it." The invaders forced the captives to march about 1,000 miles to Malagasco and the coast while at the same time the raiding force captured more Africans. In a turn of events, the captors are attacked and defeated by a local raiding party. Instead of being set free, he remained in bondage and continued his journey toward the coast and eventually arrived at Anomabu. In the late spring of 1739, a slave ship carrying Smith sailed from Anomabo to Barbados with 260 captives and then to Rhode Island. On board, Broteer was purchased by Robinson Mumford of Rhode Island for four gallons of rum and a piece of calico and renamed "Venture." During the Middle Passage to Barbados a smallpox outbreak took the lives of 60 of his fellow captives. While most of the surviving captives were sold in Barbados, he was brought to New England.

Life in the Americas and death
Smith relays in his narrative that upon the ship's arrival in Barbados, all but four of the enslaved persons were sold to Barbadian planters, on August 23, 1739. Smith and three others sailed on to Rhode Island, arriving early in the fall of 1739. Afterwards, Smith went to live at Mumford's residence on Fishers Island, New York. Once there, he was forced to work in the household. At this time, he showed his loyalty to his enslaver. When he received the keys of trunks, he did not give them others even if the enslaver's father asked him to do so. Because of his work, his enslaver increasingly trusted Smith. He served dutifully and was praised highly after faithfully guarding the contents of his enslaver's chest for an extended period of time. Nevertheless, Smith was subjected to intense and back-breaking labor at a young age, and severe punishments. His enslaver's son, in particular, tormented him and abused him, and one point attempted to beat him with a pitchfork and ultimately tied him up and whipped him for his defiance. As he grew older, he endured more arduous tasks and severe punishments.

In his narrative, Smith recalls his initial experience with his first "white master", who possessed abundant fertile land near the river.What river? He mentions how his landlord had a tender heart and treated him well, and the landlord's son and Smith even had something similar to friendship. At the age of 22, Smith married an enslaved woman named Meg (Margaret). Shortly thereafter, on March 27, 1754, he made an escape attempt, convinced to take flight by an Irish indentured servant named Heddy and two other people enslaved by Mumford. During their escape, at Montauk Point, Long Island, Heddy reveals his true intentions and attempts to steal their supplies and all their belongings. After discovering this treachery, Smith and his compatriots hunted down and captured Heddy and returned him to his enslaver, receiving a warm welcome and appreciation for their efforts.

In 1754, Smith and his wife had a daughter called Hannah. Less than a month later, Smith was forcefully separated from his family when he was sold to Thomas Stanton in Stonington, Connecticut. They were reunited the following year when Stanton bought Meg and Hannah. After Smith had begun saving money that he had earned from working outside jobs and selling produce he grew, he hoped to buy freedom for his family. His time enslaved by the Stanton's began peacefully, but he was thrown into discord after Smith found his wife and the wife of Thomas Stanton in a heated dispute, with the latter beating upon the former with a switch. When Smith tried to break up the fight, Mrs. Stanton turned the switch upon him and so Smith took it from her grasp and threw it into the fire. In retaliation for this, Thomas Stanton attacked Smith seemingly out of the blue with a boat oar. After fending off this attack, a vexed Smith went to local authorities to complain about his abuse. Stanton and his brother, who had come to do violence unto Smith for his rebellion received a harsh warning and were publicly humiliated. In revenge for this, the brothers once again assaulted Smith once they were out of sight of the courthouse, and were once again overcome and repulsed by Smith.
I became enraged at this and immediately turned them both under me, laid one of them across the other, and stamped both with my feet what I would. This occasioned my master's brother to advise him to put me off.

Due to this tumultuous series of events, Smith determined to liberate himself from the Stantons. The Smiths had two more children, Solomon in 1756 and Cuff in 1761. Smith was sold twice more. In 1760, he ended up enslaved by Capt. Oliver Smith, who agreed to let him buy his freedom. Smith let Venture work for money when his labor was not required at home. Venture Smith tried to earn money by going out to work. Finally, in the spring of 1765, Venture Smith purchased his freedom for 71 pounds and two shillings, a notably exorbitant price.

A free man
Smith moved to Long Island. In 1769, after cutting wood and investing the money he made, Smith purchased his sons, Solomon and Cuff. He earned money to purchase his sons by cutting and cording wood, of which he said he did upwards of 400 cords and threshing out 75 bushels of grain over the course of 6 months. To purchase his sons, he paid 200 dollars (each). He then purchased an enslaved Black man for 40 pounds and gave him 60 pounds but the man ran away still owing Smith 40 pounds.

He hired out Solomon, his oldest son, to Charles Church for one year to be paid 12 pounds. Solomon being 17 years of age and an able body was, as dictated by Smith, "all my hope and dependence for help." During his year of employment, Church had outfitted a whaling boat and convinced the young Solomon to join and in return, he would be compensated with his normal wages and a bonus of a pair of silver buckles. When Smith caught word of the expedition he set off in an attempt to stop his son from putting out to sea, but when he arrived at Church's house he could only see the boat on the horizon. Smith would never again see his oldest son because while on the expedition, he caught scurvy and died.

Soon after the death of his son Smith purchased his wife for 40 pounds. He did this expeditiously as she was then pregnant with his unborn child. If she had given birth before he was able to purchase her, he would have had to buy both his wife and his child separately. After welcoming another son, Smith named him Solomon in memory of his deceased eldest son.

Smith experienced multiple financial and personal setbacks. He bought an enslaved Black man for 400 dollars. However, he wanted to return to his old enslaver, so Smith released him.  Venture Smith purchased another enslaved Black man for 25 pounds. After his daughter, Hannah was married, she came down with an illness. However, her husband did not pay adequate attention to her health. Although Smith nursed her, she died. In addition, two people he enslaved ran away. In his early sixties, he was unjustly charged with the loss of a white man's property and charged for ten pounds while visiting New London. Although being absent from the scene with witnesses, he was still prosecuted. Smith then carried this matter to other courts, claiming his innocence, but the judgment was never reversed. This misleading judgment was made out of discrimination against Black people. Remembering this experience, he said: "Captain Hart was a white gentleman, and I a poor African, therefore it was all right, and good enough for the black dog. "

In 1775, Smith bought a farm at Haddam Neck, on the Salmon River, in Connecticut. By 1778 he had expanded the initial 10 acres to form a farm of at least 130 acres. Additionally, he made a living by fishing, whaling, farming his land, and trading in the Long Island basin. He lived the remainder of his life at Haddam Neck.

In 1798, Smith dictated his life experiences and with his family had it printed by The Bee, in New London, CT. By this time Venture was showing the signs of his old age: his strong, tall body was bowed and he was going blind. The narrative has been the subject of some contention, regarded in many instances as "whitewashed" and inauthentic. It was suspected that the white editor manipulated Smith's story, a common practice among editors of slave narratives. After four conferences and numerous scholarly papers, it is the conclusion of most scholars and the Documenting Venture Smith Project that the Narrative is entirely Venture Smith's own words. The work is titled A Narrative of the Life and Adventures of Venture, a Native of Africa: But Resident above Sixty Years in the United States of America.

Film, media, and popular culture

He is referenced in the 1971 film Let's Scare Jessica to Death, by the title character, who makes a gravestone rubbing of Smith's headstone, and later reads it to her husband.

Smith was featured in the 1996 PBS television documentary series "Africans in America" and was the subject of a 2006 USA Today newspaper story.

Russell Shorto's 2017 book, Revolution Song contains a chapter detailing Smith's life story.

See also
 List of enslaved people

Notes and references

External links

Editions of Smith's narrative
 A Narrative of the Life and Adventures of Venture, a Native of Africa: But Resident above Sixty Years in the United States of America. Related by Himself. New-London, CT: Printed by C Holt, at The Bee-office, 1798.
 A Narrative of the Life and Adventures of Venture, a Native of Africa, but Resident Above Sixty Years in the United States of America. Middletown, CT: JS Stewart, 1897.

About Smith
 The Free Man, American History Tellers Podcast, by Wondery, covering Smith's life.
 James Stewart, ed. Venture Smith and the Business of Slavery and Freedom, Amherst: University of Massachusetts Press, 2010.
 Making Freedom: The Extraordinary Life of Venture Smith Middletown, CT: Wesleyan University Press, 2009.
 Venture Smith
 Time Line – Life of Venture Smith. Documenting Venture Smith Project
 Digging Into The Past: The Venture Smith Site
 

Ghanaian emigrants to the United States
18th-century American slaves
People who wrote slave narratives
1720s births
Year of birth uncertain
1805 deaths